Queerala, a registered community based Organisation (CBO) for Malayali LGBTIQ people, gives adequate support to Malayali persons who belong to the sexual and gender minorities. Queerala originally started in May 2013 as a secret Facebook page where closeted LGBTQAI+ community members met over the internet. Since its start of operations, Queerala has been an active platform for the rights of the LGBTIQ+ community in Kerala and India and focuses on various awareness campaigns on Sexual Orientation, Gender Identity/Expression and Sex Characteristics (SOGIESC). Queerala's representatives has been marking its presence, in areas of literature, art, cultural spaces, academic discourses as well, besides conducting case studies on issues pertaining to sexual orientation and gender identity. They also focus on sensitisation on SOGIESC inclusive healthcare services, educational curriculum, workplace policies and local self governance.

Major Operations

Legal Support 
Queerala, with its association with Human Rights Friendly lawyers, support LGBTIQ persons who seek legal aid for various human rights concerns.

Peer Counselling and Helpline 
Queerala's helpline is operational and aids queer persons to get connected with peer persons, counselors, psychiatrists etc. Queerala has helped start multiple LGBTQAI+ support groups in colleges. By 2018, two such recognised student groups were set up:

1) Umeed in IIM Kozhikode

2) Coming Out Club in the Central University of Kerala, Kasaragod.

Queerala Helpline : +91 7012503861

Case Studies and Research 
Queerala encourages and support research enthusiasts, who follow ethical practices of research methodology, to take up qualitative studies pertaining to LGBTIQ lives

Engagement with Faith Groups 
Considering the challenges faced by most LGBTIQ persons from the faith and sexuality, Queerala engages with various faith based collectives like NCCI (Nation Council of Churches in India) for dialogues on Inclusive Churches, Faith versus Sexuality etc.

Projects

Wiki Loves Pride: LGBT Edit-a-thon 
A one-day program organised in collaboration with Wikimedia India Chapter, the edit-at-hon enabled its participants to include LGBT related articles and terminologies to Wikipedia, both in Malayalam and English.

Homomorphism

Homomorphism I 
Homomorphism is an art attempt by team Queerala to bring the less depicted notions of same-sex intimacy. The first edition of homomorphism hada round 70 art works by 5 Malayali Queer artists

Homomorphism II 
Homomorphism II was, a follow-up to the first edition of the art project by Queerala, and the second edition focused on same-sex desire and the social positions associated with same-sex lovers. Held at Kerala Museum Homomorphsim II had 7 participating artists.

Quest 2016 
Quest 2016 was a Two Day National Seminar, held at Center for Development Studies, Trivandrum. The seminar had dialogues on Queer lives and paper presentations by researchers from across India

Q-Loid 2019 
Q-Loid was a One Day LGBTIQ Film Festival organized by Queerala in July, 2019. Along with queer-themed film screenings, the event also had panel discussions on related topics. The festival venue was Kerala Museum, Kochi.

Etymology
Queerala gets its name from Queer + Kerala. The community emphasises on creating awareness in society regarding LGBTIQ issues, with focus on queer lives in Kerala.

References

External links
 

LGBTQ
Pride parades in India
2013 establishments in Kerala